Adam MacDougall (born August 1974 in New York City, New York), is a keyboardist and founding member of the band Circles Around the Sun. Previously, he played with The Black Crowes, replacing Rob Clores for the album Warpaint in July 2007. He was a member of The Ben Taylor Band and Furslide, and he has also toured with Macy Gray and Patti Rothberg.

Discography

with The Black Crowes
Warpaint, March 3, 2008
Warpaint Live, April 28, 2009
Before the Frost...Until the Freeze, September 1, 2009
Croweology, August 3, 2010
Wiser for the Time, March 19, 2013

with Chris Robinson Brotherhood
Big Moon Ritual, June 5, 2012
The Magic Door, September 11, 2012
Phosphorescent Harvest, April 29, 2014
Any Way You Love, We Know How You Feel, July 29, 2016
Barefoot in the Head, July 21, 2017
Servants of the Sun, June 14, 2019

Various
Macy Gray, The Trouble with Being Myself, July 15, 2003
Jason Darling, Night Like My Head, October 7, 2003
Chacon, Matches & Gasoline, 2003
Our Lady Peace, Healthy in Paranoid Times, August 30, 2005
Natasha Bedingfield, N.B., April 30, 2007
Maroon 5, It Won't Be Soon Before Long, May 22, 2007
Lili Haydn, Place Between Places, April 1, 2008
Lenka, Lenka, September 23, 2008
Julian Casablancas, Phrazes for the Young, October 20, 2009
Jarrod Gorbel, Devil's Made a New Friend, August 31, 2010
The Elected, Bury Me in My Rings, May 17, 2011
Mia Doi Todd, Cosmic Ocean Ship, May 17, 2011
Jonathan Wilson, Gentle Spirit, August 8, 2011
Phil Lesh and Friends, Various Performances, 2012
Circles Around The Sun, Fare Thee Well Setbreak music, 2015

Source:

References

American rock keyboardists
The Black Crowes members
1974 births
Living people
Chris Robinson Brotherhood members
Furslide members
21st-century American keyboardists